An impasse is a breakdown in negotiations.

Impasse may also refer to:

Film
Impasse (film), a 1969 American film starring Burt Reynolds
Cliff Walkers, a 2021 Chinese historical spy thriller previously titled Impasse in English

Music
Impasse (album), a 2002 album by Richard Buckner
"Impasse" (Marília Mendonça song), a 2015 Brazilian single
"Impasse" (Angel Olsen song), from the 2019 album All Mirrors
"The Impasse" (Hookworms song), from their 2014 album The Hum

See also
Impasse des Deux Anges, a 1948 French comedy crime film directed by Maurice Tourneur
Impasse de la vignette, a 1990 French-Belgian-Canadian comedy-drama film